Férel is a commune in the Morbihan department of Brittany in north-western France. Inhabitants of Férel are called in French Férélais.

See also
La Baule - Guérande Peninsula
Communes of the Morbihan department

References

External links

Official site 
Mayors of Morbihan Association 

Communes of Morbihan